Zatrephes mirabilis is a Neotropical species of moths in the family Erebidae. It is found in French Guiana.

The species was formerly considered the sole species in the genus Lalanneia, which is now considered synonymous to Zatrephes.

References

Phaegopterina
Moths described in 1990